Lancaster is an unincorporated community in Lancaster Township, Huntington County, Indiana.

History
Lancaster, originally named New Lancaster, was laid out and platted in 1836.

Geography

References

Unincorporated communities in Huntington County, Indiana
Unincorporated communities in Indiana